Alphamyces is a genus of fungi belonging to the family Alphamycetaceae.

The species of this genus are found in Great Britain.

Species:
 Alphamyces chaetifer (Sparrow) Letcher

References

Fungi